The possessions of the Islamic prophet Muhammad are a group of his items and possessions such as weapons, armor and clothing, including those known with unique names. There is doubt about the attribution of these possessions to Muhammad, as many of them were lost during wars and tribulations.

Weapons

Swords 
Muhammad had nine swords: 2 through inheritance, 3 as booty, and some from being given as gifts. Eight of the nine swords of Muhammed are in the Topkapi Palace, Turkey. The 9th one is in Cairo, Egypt.

However, only the "Dhu al-faqar" was proven in the authentic Sunnah of these swords.
 Al-’Adb is the name of sword meaning “anger” or “sharp.” This sword was sent to Muhammad by one of his companions, Saʽd ibn ʽUbadah, just before the Battle of Badr. Muhammad also used this sword at the Battle of Uhud and his followers used it, to note one companion Samaak bin Kharsha (commonly known as "Abu Dujanah"), to demonstrate their fealty to him, to show the strength, solidity and durability of Islam and Muslims' elegance in front of the Qurayshis who opposed him. Currently the sword is in the Al-Hussein Mosque in Cairo, Egypt.
 Al-Ma’thur, also known as “Ma’thur al-Fijar” is the sword which was owned by Muhammad before he received his first revelations in Mecca. This sword was given to him due to the will of his father. When Muhammad migrated from Mecca to Medina, the sword remained with him until it was transferred to Ali ibn Abi Talib, along with other war equipment. The length of the sword with the handle is 95 cm, the length of the handle is 14 cm, the width at the handle is 4 cm, while the length of the blade is 81 cm, and the length at the tip is 3.5 cm. The handle is make of gold in the shape of two serpents, and is encrusted with emeralds and turquoise. Near the handle is an inscription saying: Abdullah ibn Abd al-Muttalib. This sword is housed in the Topkapi Museum, Istanbul.
 Ar-Rasub. The sword is preserved in the Topkapi museum, Istanbul. The blade of this sword is 140 cm in length. It has gold circles.
 Al-Battar (meaning "cutter") sword was taken by Muhammad as booty from the Banu Qaynaqa. It is called the “sword of the prophets” and is inscribed in Arabic with the names of David, Solomon, Moses, Aaron, Joshua, Zechariah, John, Jesus, and Muhammad. It also has a drawing of King David cutting off the head of Goliath. The sword also features a Nabataean inscription. The length of blade of this sword is 101 cm, the sword is made of copper with a black sheath. It is currently in the Topkapi Museum in Istanbul, along with eight of the nine preserved swords of Muhammad. It is claimed by some to be the sword that Jesus will use when he returns to Earth to defeat the anti-Christ, Dajjal.
 Hatf (meaning "death") is a sword which Muhammad took as booty from the Banu Qaynaqa. It is said that King David took the sword “al-Battar” from Goliath as booty when he defeated him, when he was less than 20 years old. God gave King David the ability to work with iron, to make armour and weapons and instruments of war, and using his ability made for himself a sword. It was thus that the Hatf sword came about, resembling the al-Battar but larger than it. He used this sword and it was passed onto the tribe of Levites who kept the weapons of the Israelites until it passed into the hands of Muhammad. Nowadays this sword is housed in the Topkapi museum. The blade of this sword is 112 cm in length and has a width of 8 cm. It is the heaviest of swords and Muhammad gave the sword to Ali bin Abi Talib.
 Qal’i sword is known as “Qal’i” or “Qul’ay.” This sword is one of the three swords which Muhammad acquired as booty from the Banu Qaynaqa. . Inscribed in Arabic on its blade above the handle is: “This is the noble sword of the house of Muhammad the prophet, the apostle of God.” The blade of this sword is distinguished from the other swords because of its wave-like design. Now the sword is preserved in the Topkapi Museum, Istanbul. Its length is 114 cm, the length of its handle is 13 cm, the length of the blade is 91 cm, and the width at the handle is 5.5 cm and the tip is 4.5 cm.
 Dhu al-Faqar was taken as booty by Muhammad at the Battle of Badr. The length of the sword with the handle is 104 cm, the length of the handle is 15 cm, the length of the blade is 89 cm, and the width at the handle is 6 cm and at the tip is 4.5 cm.
 Al-Mikhdham (meaning "segments of part of the main body or vertebrae") is now in the Topkapi Museum, Istanbul. The blade is 97 cm in length.
 Al-Qadib (meaning "rod, staff") is a thin-bladed sword which was a sword of defense or companionship for the traveller but not used to battle. Written on the side of the sword in silver is the inscription: “There is no god but Allah (God), Muhammad is the Messenger of Allah (God) – Muhammad bin Abdu 'llah bin Abdu 'l-Muttalib.” There is no indication in any historical source that this sword was used in any battle. It stayed in the house of Muhammad. The length of the sword is 100 cm, the length of the blade is 86 cm, the length of its handle is 14 cm, and its width at the handle is 2.8 cm, and at the shrew is 2.2 cm, and has a scabbard of dyed animal hide. This sword is housed in the Topkapi Museum, Istanbul.

Quiver
Muhammad had a quiver, Al-Kafur. This quiver had a strap made from tanned skin. This quiver had also three silver circular rings, a buckle, and an edge made of silver.

Bows
Muhammad owned 6 bows.
 Az-Zawra
 Ar-Rauha
 As-Safra
 Al-Bayda'
 Al-Katum: This bow broke during the Battle of Uhud and later was taken by Qatadah bin an-Nu’man
 As-Saddad

Spears
Muhammad owned five spears:
 Al-Muthwi
 Al-Muthni
 An-Na'bah: a small spear
 Al-Bayda' a bigger spear
 Anazah: a short lance, which Muhammad held while attending the ‘Id festivals, and used to place in front of him when he led the prayer, using it as a sutrah. Sometimes, Muhammad walked while holding the ‘Anazah.

Armor
Muhammad had seven pieces of armor
 Dhat al-Fudul, which he pawned with Abu ash-Shahm, a Jew, in return for some 30 sa’ (weights relate to food) of barley for his family. The debt was for a year. This armor was made of iron.
 Dhat al-Wishah
 Dhat al-Hawashi
 As-Sa’diyyah
 Fiddah
 Al-Batra
 Al-Khirniq

Helmets 

Muhammad had several helmets:
 Al-Muwashah: a helmet made of iron, adorned with copper.
 As-Sabugh or Dhu as-Sabugh

Shields
Muhammad had several shields:
 Az-Zalluq
 Al-Futaq was given to Muhammad as a gift, It is also said that there was a picture of a statue on the shield. Muhammad always placed his hand on the image of the statue on his shield. Allah made the image fade away.

Clothing and accessories
Muhammad owned three long shirts (jubbas in Arabic) which he wore during battle. In one of the narrations from Ahmad, he said that it is allowed to wear silk during war.

Accessory items included:
 Al-'Uqab: a black banner or flag. According to hadith of Abu Dawud's "Sunan" from one of the Companions who said: "I saw the Prophet’s banner, it was yellow."
 White banners that were sometimes mixed with black.
 A pavilion called Al-Kann, and a crook that was one cubit's length long which Muhammad would carry while walking or riding.
 A baton called Al-'Arjun.
 A staff called Al-Mamshuq.

Descriptions 
The 9th-century Emir Ahmad Ibn Tulun mentioned in his book “Mufākahat al-Khullān fī Hawādith Az-Zamān”, in the incidents of the year 19 AH (640 CE) and 900 AH (1500 CE) that some claimed that they had a mug and some crutches of Muhammad and that “it was found that they are not of the possessions of the Prophet Muhammad, but rather they are the fragments of al-Layth ibn Sa'd."

The 15th-century scholar al-Suyuti said, on the authority of Muhammad (his garment): 

The modern scholar Ahmed Taymour says - after listing the remnants attributed to Muhammad in Istanbul:

See also
Relics of Muhammad
Sacred Relics (Topkapı Palace)
 Bayt al-Mawlid, the house where Muhammad is believed to have been born.

References

External links
al-Mikhdham (inc. image) - source: Center for Middle East and Islamic Studies, Department of History, United States Naval Academy
List of Prophet's Swords

Possessions of Muhammad
Weapon history